The fundaments of the Brazilian Unified Health System (SUS) were established in the Brazilian Constitution of 1988, under the principles of universality, integrality and equity. It has a decentralized operational and management system, and social participation is present in all administrative levels. The Brazilian health system is a complex composition of public sector (SUS), private health institutions and private insurances . Since the creation of SUS, Brazil has significantly improved in many health indicators, but a lot needs to be done in order to achieve Universal Health Coverage (UHC).

The Human Rights Measurement Initiative finds that Brazil is doing 93.3% of what should be possible at its level of income for the right to health.

Health situation in Brazil 

Mortality by non-transmissible illness: 16.6% as of 2016. Of this 65.7 deaths per 100,000 inhabitants is caused by heart and circulatory diseases, along with 26.7 deaths per 100,000 inhabitants is caused by cancer.
 Mortality caused by external causes (transportation, violence and suicide): 55.7 deaths per 100,000 inhabitants (10.9% of all deaths in the country), reaching 62.3 deaths in the southeast region.

Brazil has reduced the malaria incidence by over 56%in the past decade compared to the year 2000, but yet it is the country in the region of the americas with the highest number of cases.

Dengue is found in all the states of the country, with 4 viral stereotypes. Reported cases: 1.649.008 (2014).

In 2014 occurred the introduction of the Chikungunya fever virus in the country, and in 2015 the Zika virus, which are transmitted by Aedes aegypti. The vector is being faced with the strategy of Integrated Management vector and community awareness approach.

In September, 30th 2020 the country has recorded more than 142.000 deaths linked to COVID-19 and more than 4.745.464 confirmed cases. It is one of the worst affected country just behind The US and India.

Life expectancy

The life expectancy of the Brazilian population increased from 71.16 years in 1998 to 76.76 years in 2018, according to the Brazilian Institute of Geography and Statistics (IBGE), and currently 76.76 years in 2018. The data indicate a significant progress compared with 59.50 years in 1940.

Demographic projections foresee the continuation of this process, estimating a life expectancy in Brazil around 77.39 years in 2020. According to the IBGE, Brazil will need some time to catch up with Japan, Hong Kong (China), Switzerland, Iceland, Australia, France and Italy, where the average life expectancy is already over 82. Although, research has shown that Brazil could achieve an expectancy of around 80.12 years by 2030 and pass 82 by 2040 and 2050 will be over 85 years.

The decline in mortality at young ages and the increase in longevity, combined with the decline of fecundity and the accentuated increase of degenerative chronic diseases, caused a rapid process of demographic and epidemiological transition, imposing a new public health agenda in the face of the complexity of the new morbidity pattern.

Infant mortality

For example, mortality among indigenous infants in 2000 was more than triple that of the general population, highlighting the importance of tailored health policies to address disparities in health outcomes for Brazil's Indigenous Peoples. Sanitation, education and per capita income are the most important explanatory factors of poor child health in Brazil. Moreover, ethnographic findings of infant mortality rates (IMR) in northeast Brazil are not accurate because the government tends to overlook infant morality rates in rural areas. These issues tend to be inaccurate due to a huge amount of underreporting and questions related to the cultural validity and the contextual soundness of these mortality statistics. There is a solution to this issue however and scientists stress that quality local-level cultural data can serve to craft as the alternative and appropriate method to measure infant death in Brazil accurately. In order to not overlook infant mortality rates it is also stressed that there needs to be a focus on an ethnography of experience, a vision that cuts to the core of human suffering as it flows from daily life and experiences. For example, one must get down to the flesh, blood and souls of infant death in the impoverished households of Brazilians in order to understand and live with those who have to suffer its consequences. Methods of gathering mortality data also need to be respectful of local death customs and must be implemented in places where death is experienced through a different cultural lens.

UNICEF report shows a rising rate of survival for Brazilian children under the age of five. UNICEF says that out of a total of 195 countries analyzed, Brazil is among the 25 nations with the best improvement in survival rates for children under the age of 5. The report shows that Brazil's infant mortality rate for live births in 2012 was 14 per thousand. Mortality rates for children at one year of age was 18 per thousand, a reduction of 60%. The study went on to show that malnutrition among children of less than two years of age during the period between 2000 and 2008 fell by 77%. There was also a substantial drop in the number of school age children who were not in school, falling from 920,000 to 570,000 during the same period. Cristina Albuquerque, coordinator of the UNICEF Infant Survival and Development Program called the numbers "an enormous victory" for Brazil. She added that with regard to public policy aimed at reducing social disparities, Brazil's Bolsa Família program had become an international benchmark in combating poverty, reducing vulnerability and improving quality of life. "Brazil is going through a great moment, but much remains to be done. So, along with the celebrating it is a good time to reflect on the many challenges still to be overcome," Albuquerque declared.

Obesity

Obesity in Brazil is a growing health concern. 52.6 percent of men and 44.7 percent of women in Brazil are overweight. 35% of Brazilians are obese in 2018. The Brazilian government has issued nutrition guidelines in 2014  which have caught the attention of public health experts for their simplicity and their critical position towards the food industry. In September 2020 the Ministry of Agriculture publicised a technical note saying that the Guideine " Attacks without justification " industrialized food and asked for revision of the recommendation. International scientists send a group letter to the ministry of Agriculture criticizing the position in relation to The Brazilian food guide..The guidelines are summarized at the end of the document as follows:

 Prepare meals using fresh and staple foods.
 Use oils, fats, sugar, and salt only in moderation.
 Limit consumption of ready-to-eat food and drink products.
 Eat at regular mealtimes and pay attention to your food instead of multitasking. Find a comfortable place to eat. Avoid all-you-can-eat buffets and noisy, stressful environments.
 Eat with others whenever possible.
 Buy food in shops and markets that offer a variety of fresh foods. Avoid those that sell mainly ready-to-eat products.
 Develop, practise, share, and enjoy your skills in food preparation and cooking.
 Decide as a family to share cooking responsibilities and dedicate enough time for health-supporting meals.
 When you dine out, choose restaurants that serve freshly made dishes. Avoid fast-food chains.
 Be critical of food-industry advertising.

Climate change and health 

The WHO Country Report on Climate and Health - 2015  placed Brazil as an important and unique player in climate change for being economically and environmentally relevant. It is among the largest economies in the world and at least 60% of the Amazon rainforest is in its territory.  

The main vulnerabilities posed by climate change in this report were "risk of coastal flooding, reduced water availability, health risks associated with heat stress, and interference in climate sensitive vector borne diseases, such as malaria and dengue". 

Another threat that could be softened by decarbonization is outdoor air pollution, which is mainly a consequence of the use of fossil fuels for energy generation and transportation. It poses a major risk for respiratory, cardiovascular, dermatological diseases and cancers, particularly for the population living in the urban areas. In Brazil, between 2010 and 2012, 4 out of the 5 most populated cities which had the information about air pollution available were above the annual mean for fine particulate matter (PM2.5) levels of 10 µg/m3 from the WHO guideline.

Inland river flood risk can also be more frequent and affect broader areas in a high emission scenario, putting additional 78,600 people at risk of drowning, food insecurity, lack of access to safe water and sanitation, infectious diseases outbreaks and socio-economic changes.

In 2016, Brazil developed a National Adaptation Plan to Climate Change, coordinated by the Ministry of Environment and with the participation of 26 Federal Government Institutions, among then, the Ministry of Health. Other agents from civil-society, private-sector and the state also contributed to the writing.

Under the section of health and climate change, this plan focused on 4 main health-related risks associated to climate: natural disasters, air pollution, unavailability and quality of water resources and climate sensitive infectious diseases. For each risk, they analyzed vulnerabilities and potential impacts in the population and in the health system. Further on, the document provided guidance and strategies focusing on evidence and information management, awareness and education, potential alliances, and adaptation measures.

In December 2020, Brazil submitted to the UN Framework Convention on Climate Change (UNFCCC) an updated Nationally Determined Contribution (NDC) under the Paris Agreement, with the compromise of reducing greenhouse gas (GHG) emissions by 37% until 2025 and 43% until 2030, relative to 2005.

Nevertheless, as for September 2021, the Climate Action Tracker (CAT) rated Brazilian response to mitigate climate change as Insufficient. The underlying reasons are challenges faced by the country to keep COVID-19 under control, increasing deforestation rate trends and unsatisfactory policies for halting emissions growth and support the energy transition to a greener and more sustainable one.

Even so, in May 2021, seven Brazilian-healthcare institutions (out of 43 in the world so far) joined the Race to Zero campaign, a United Nations initiative to promote leadership and ramp up the move to achieve net zero and a healthier, greener, and sustainable economy. Many Brazilian companies and cities are also committed to this initiative as a global effort to hasten Government's contributions to achieve the Paris Agreement.

See also 
 Healthcare in Brazil
 Sistema Único de Saúde
 HIV/AIDS in Brazil
 Education in Brazil
 Demography of Brazil
 Brazilian traditional medicine

References

External links
 World Health Organization: Brazil
 Brazilian National Health Agency
 Brazilian Ministry of Health
 Brazilian National Health Confederation